Celebrity Treasure Island 2019 marked the show's return after a hiatus of more than a decade. Hosted by Survivor NZ producer and host, Matt Chisholm, as well as ZM radio's Drive host Bree Tomasel. The classic Kiwi game show will have 16 celebrity castaways pair up as they complete challenges for the chance to win $100,000 for their charity of choice in Fiji. The season premiered on Sunday 18 August, 7 pm and continues Monday & Tuesday 7.30 pm, TVNZ 2. This was to be the final show that Matt Chisholm presented with TVNZ.

Sam Wallace was the sole Kāhu member left, and the eventual winner, who took $100,000 for Starship Hospital. Shane Cameron and Gary 'The Wiz' Freeman were the other two finalists, and Athena Angelou finished fourth. This season raised $170,000 across 9 various charities across Aotearoa.

Castaways
The 16 celebrities were initially separated into two tribes with te reo Māori names based on fauna of New Zealand: Mako (Shortfin Shark) and Kāhu (Swamp Harrier), including the merged tribe as Kākāriki (parakeets).

The 16 contestants were: Boxer Shane Cameron; former Canterbury and All Black winger, Zac Guildford; DJ Athena Angelou; Olympic champion board sailor Barbara Kendall; Olympic champion rower and road cycling time trialist, Eric Murray; former rugby league star and coach Gary 'The Wiz' Freeman; actress Jodie Rimmer; Former Shortland Street star Karl Burnett (retired due to mental exhaustion); singer Ladi6; fitness model and middle-distance runner Lana Van Hout; former Bachelor contestant Lily McManus; TVNZ morning show weatherman Matty McLean; former weatherman, children show host and current DJ Sam Wallace; Moses Mackay of Sol3 Mio; influencer, model and former charity boxer Roseanna Arkle; and former C4 host and DJ turned yoga instructor, Shannon Ryan.

Challenges Overview
Castaways competed against one another in a series of formidable dramatic showdowns daily to test the celeb's brains, brawn and endurance, to their limit throughout their time on the island ; 

Charity Challenges — offered cash prizes for the castaway’s chosen charities
Team Face-Offs — pitting the tribes against each other in a fight for supplies
Elimination Duels — Battles whittling down the numbers with tears, tantrums and twists

 
 The contestant was eliminated after their first time in the elimination challenge.
 The contestant was eliminated after their second time in the elimination challenge.
 The contestant was eliminated after their third time in the elimination challenge.
 The contestant was eliminated after the fourth or more time in the elimination challenge.

References

External links

Official Instagram 
Official Podcasts 

2019 New Zealand television seasons
New Zealand game shows
New Zealand reality television series
TVNZ 2 original programming
Television shows filmed in Fiji
Television shows set in Fiji